Shadow Ranger is a 1926 American silent film directed by Denver Dixon, starring Art Mix. It premiered on June 14, 1926, in Poughkeepsie, New York.

References

1926 films
American silent feature films
American black-and-white films
Films directed by Victor Adamson
1920s English-language films
1920s American films